A cranioclast (from Greek κρανίον kranion "head, scull" and -κλάστης -klastes "breaker") is surgical instrument akin to a strong forceps. It was once used to crush and then extract the skull of a fetus so as to facilitate delivery in cases of obstructed labour.

Pictures

See also 
 Cephalotribe
 Puerperal fever
 Instruments used in general surgery

References

Surgical instruments